The Atlantic Singles Collection 1967–1970 is a compilation album of singer Aretha Franklin, released by Rhino Records in September 2018. The album contains her first 17 singles for Atlantic Records released in the United States from her debut for the label "I Never Loved a Man (The Way I Love You)" of February 1967 through "Border Song (Holy Moses)" of October 1970. The Amazon sales website identifies these as digitally remastered versions of the original mono issues, although that is not indicated in the set's liner notes or packaging. The original recordings were produced by Jerry Wexler, at times in collaboration with Tom Dowd and Arif Mardin.

Content
Most of these singles, both A and b sides, appeared on the Atlantic Records albums released by Franklin during the same years. Some singles were released ahead of those albums, with others appearing on the market after the album. All 17 A-sides made the Top 40 on the Billboard Hot 100, while the first eight all charted in the top ten including her chart-topping signature song, "Respect." Six b-sides also made the Billboard chart independently, with her version of "I Say a Little Prayer" also making the top ten. Missing is her 1968 version of "(I Can't Get No) Satisfaction" released as a single in the United Kingdom only.

These singles are arguably the greatest work of Franklin's career. Of the 34 tracks on this set, seven appear on the Billboard list of her ten greatest songs, 16 appear on the Rolling Stone list of Franklin's greatest 50 songs, while half of the tally for Franklin's 20 essential songs according to The New York Times appear on this set.

Most tracks were recorded at Atlantic Studios in New York City with session musicians from FAME Studios in Muscle Shoals, Alabama. Franklin's initial session for Atlantic took place at the Fame Studios in Muscle Shoals, and two additional sessions took place at Criteria Studios in Miami. The Dixie Flyers credit refers to the musicians at the Criteria sessions.

Track listing

Disc one

Disc two

 § with the Dixie Flyers

Collective personnel
Aretha Franklin — vocals, piano
Bernie Glow, Wayne Jackson, Melvin Lastie, Joe Newman, Ernie Royal, Richard Williams — trumpets
Jimmy Cleveland, Urbie Green, Benny Powell, Tony Studd — trombones
Pepper Adams, Willie Bridges, Charles Chalmers, King Curtis, George Dorsey, Haywood Henry, Andrew Love, Seldon Powell, Frank Wess — saxophones
Jack Jennings, Warren Smith, Ted Summer — vibraphone
Barry Beckett, Jim Dickinson, Junior Mance, Spooner Oldham, Billy Preston, Truman Thomas, Mike Utley – keyboards
Duane Allman, Kenny Burrell, Eric Clapton, Cornell Dupree, Charlie Freeman, Eddie Hinton, Jimmy Johnson, Chips Moman, Joe South, Bobby Womack — guitars
Ron Carter, Tommy Cogbill, David Hood, Jerry Jemmott, Tommy McClure, Chuck Rainey  — bass
Bruno Carr, Gene Chrisman, Sammy Creason, Roger Hawkins, Ray Lucas – drums
Louis Golcdecha, Manuel Gonzales – percussion
J.R. Bailey, Margaret Branch, Ronald Bright, Brenda Bryant, Carolyn Franklin, Erma Franklin, Evelyn Green, Ellie Greenwich, Cissy Houston, Wyline Ivy, Amanda Lattimore, Pat Lewis, Sammy Turner, The Sweet Inspirations — backing vocals
Ralph Burns, Arif Mardin — string arrangements, conductor

Charts

References

Aretha Franklin compilation albums
2018 compilation albums
Rhino Records compilation albums